Muktar Aliyu Betara is a Nigerian accountant and lawmaker, first elected to the House of Representatives of the Federal Republic of Nigeria in 2007 to represent the Biu/Bayo/Shani Federal Constituency of Borno State in the North-eastern region of Nigeria. He is currently the Chairman, House Committee on Appropriations in the 9th Assembly which held its first session on 11 June 2019. This marks his fourth tenure as a member of the House of Representatives.

Family and early life 
Betara who is an indigene of Wuyo in Biu township, Borno State, was born on 22 November 1966 into a large family; he is the twelfth of 21 children. His father was a civil servant heading several community councils while his mother was a devoted housewife.

Education 
Betara began his education at Biu Central Primary School in 1973 and obtained his First School Leaving Certificate in 1978. He proceeded to Biu Central Junior Day Secondary School, and then to Government Technical Secondary School Benishek, Borno State, where his leadership skills saw him becoming head prefect, and would eventually obtain his West Africa School Certificate in 1983. He advanced his education at Ramat Polytechnic, Maiduguri where he obtained his Ordinary National Diploma (OND) in Business Administration in 1986.

Career 
He launched into his professional career working as an Accountant with the Presidency, on the Directorate for Food, Roads and Rural Infrastructure (DFFRI) programme from 1986 to 1990. He returned to Ramat Polytechnic for his Higher National Diploma in 1990 and obtained an HND in Accounting and Business Administration in 1992.

Betara observed his National Youth Service Corps (NYSC) programme at Delta State Government House, Asaba. Upon completion of his service year, he joined the defunct Nigerian Telecommunication Limited (NITEL) in 1993 rising through the ranks to the role of Manager before his voluntary retirement in 2006 to venture into politics.

Political career 
Betara reportedly was not intent on politics initially, entered the race for the House of Representatives on the platform of the All Nigerian Peoples Party (ANPP) and got elected as the member representing the interests of Biu, Kwaya Kusar, Bayo and Shani Federal Constituency at the House of Assembly in 2007.

Since then, he has been re-elected three times, emerging as one of the few members to have served in the sixth, seventh, eighth and ninth assemblies in Nigeria, with the current and immediate past tenures secured on the platform of the All Progressives Congress (APC).

Posts held in the House of Representatives 
Between 2007 and 2011, Betara acted as Chairman of the Sub-committee on NDIC, Banking and Currency. He also served as a member of the House Committee on Interior, and was subsequently appointed as Chairman, Sub-committee on Customs, Immigration and Prisons Pension Office (CIPPO).

At the seventh assembly (2011 to 2015), he was appointed as Chairman, House Committee on the Army, directly making recommendations to empower and sustain the activities of the army against the rising insurgency in the Northern region of Nigeria.

From 2015 to 2019, Betara served as Chairman of the House Committee on Defence. He is the current Chairman of the House committee on Appropriations, presiding over all other committees regarding the appropriation process in the House of Representatives. Under his leadership, the committee has succeeded in having the June-to-June budget cycle changed to a preferable January-to-December one for a more effective budget implementation. As a result, the Appropriation Act, 2022 and the Finance Act, 2021 have been passed and enacted respectively for the third consecutive year without fail, enabling all stakeholders to prepare adequately for any fiscal changes.

Betara has been lauded for his critical decision-making and crisis management skills in the House. His legislative interests include Youth and Women Empowerment, Developmental Governance, Health, Education, Social and National Security, as well as providing equal opportunities. He is believed to be responsible for the construction of 20 health care centers, 10 ambulances, a mini-stadium and the installation of more than 600 solar-powered street lights in his constituency.

Philanthropy 
Betara is believed to have deployed his personal resources to fund transplant surgeries, empower individuals for business and support local families in his constituency.

Awards and honours 
Betara has received the following awards;
 Democracy Hero’s Award for Best Performing Rep Member of the year, 2020.
 Award of Excellence by the Nigerian Union of Journalists (NUJ), North-East Zone, 2013.

He is also a member of the Nigeria Institute of Management.

Personal life 
Betara is a devout Muslim and is married to Hauwa Betara with whom he has 4 children.

References 

Nigerian accountants
Nigerian politicians
1966 births
Living people
Members of the House of Representatives (Nigeria)